Since the Iranian Revolution in 1979, the government of Iran has been accused by several countries of training, financing, and providing weapons and safe havens for non-state militant actors, such as Hezbollah in Lebanon, Hamas in Gaza, and other Palestinian groups (Islamic Jihad (PIJ) and the Popular Front for the Liberation of Palestine-General Command (PFLP-GC)). These groups are designated terrorist groups by a number of countries and international bodies; however, Iran considers such groups to be "national liberation movements" with a right to self-defense in the face of Israeli military occupation. 

The United States State Department has also accused Iranian-backed Iraqi Shia militias of terrorism against US troops, and Iran of cyberterrorism, primarily through its Quds Force.

Islamic Revolutionary Guard Corps (IRGC)
After the fall of the Shah in 1979, the Islamic Republic of Iran established the Islamic Revolutionary Guard Corps (IRGC) to domestically promote the government's social policy. IRGC is accused of spreading its ideology in neighboring regions by training and funding "terrorist organizations". By 1986, IRGC had 350,000 members and had acquired a small naval and air force. By 1996, its ground forces numbered 100,000 and the naval forces numbered 20,000. They are believed to use the Quds Force to train Islamic militants.

In 1995, the Iranian Revolutionary Guard held a conference with worldwide organizations accused of engaging in terrorism including the Japanese Red Army, the Armenian Secret Army, the Kurdistan Workers' Party, the Iraqi Da'wah Party, the Islamic Front for the Liberation of Bahrain and Hezbollah in Beirut for the sole purpose of providing training to these organizations supposedly to help in the destabilization of Gulf States and aid assistance to militants in these countries to replace the existing governments with Iran-like regimes.

The United States State Department states that IRGC provides support for Hamas, Hezbollah and Palestinian Islamic Jihad in Israel. They also say that IRGC has given much support and training to terrorists supporting the Palestinian resistance. They are also accused of aiding the Iraqi insurgency in southern Iraq.

United States designates IRGC as foreign terrorist organization 
On April 15, 2019, the United States officially designated Iran's elite IRGC as a foreign terrorist organization. This followed the earlier declaration by the U.S. President Donald Trump on April 8 that he would name Iran's elite IRGC a terrorist organization.

Alleged activities in other countries

Albania 
On 19 December 2018 Albania expelled Iran's ambassador to the country, Gholamhossein Mohammadnia, and another Iranian diplomat for "involvement in activities that harm the country's security", for "violating their diplomatic status and supporting terrorism." The expelled Iranians were alleged to have plotted terrorist attacks in the country, including targeting MEK\PMOI event to silence dissidents.

Bahrain
On 30 September 2015, Bahraini security forces discovered a large bomb-making factory in Nuwaidrat and arrested a number of suspects linked to the Iranian Revolutionary Guards. The next day, 1 October, Bahrain recalled its ambassador to Iran and asked the Iranian acting charge d’affaires to leave the kingdom within 72 hours after he was declared persona non-grata. Bahrain's decision to recall its ambassador came "in light of continued Iranian meddling in the affairs of the kingdom of Bahrain in order to create sectarian strife and to impose hegemony and control.

On 6 January 2016, Bahrain said it had dismantled a terrorist cell allegedly linked to the Revolutionary Guards and Hezbollah. The Bahraini interior ministry said the cell was planning to carry out a “series of dangerous bombings” on the kingdom, and that many members were arrested including the group's leaders, 33-year-old twins Ali and Mohammed Fakhrawi.

India
In July 2012, The Times of India reported that New Delhi police had concluded that terrorists belonging to a branch of Iran's military, the Iranian Revolutionary Guards, were responsible for an attack on 13 February 2012, during which a bomb explosion targeted an Israeli diplomat in New Delhi, India, wounding one embassy staff member, a local employee, and two passers-by. According to the report, the Iranian Revolutionary Guards may have planned other attacks on Israeli targets around the world as well.

Israel and Palestinian Territories
Iran does not recognize Israel as a state, and provides support for Hamas, Hezbollah and Palestinian Islamic Jihad.

Hamas
Iran supplies political support and weapons to Hamas, an organization classified by Israel, the United States, the United Kingdom, Canada, the European Union, Egypt, Australia and Japan as a terrorist organization. Mahmoud Abbas, President of the Palestinian National Authority, has said "Hamas is funded by Iran. It claims it is financed by donations, but the donations are nothing like what it receives from Iran". From 2000 to 2004, Hamas was responsible for killing nearly 400 Israelis and wounding more than 2,000 in 425 attacks, according to the Israeli Ministry of Foreign Affairs. From 2001 through May 2008, Hamas launched more than 3,000 Qassam rockets and 2,500 mortar attacks into Israel.

Hezbollah

During the 1980s and 1990s, a wave of kidnappings, bombings, and assassinations of Western targets, particularly American and Israeli, occurred in Lebanon and other countries. The attacks, attributed to Hezbollah, have included:
 The 1982-1983 Tyre headquarters bombings
 The blowing up of a van filled with explosives in front of the U.S. embassy in Beirut killing 58 Americans and Lebanese in 1983.
 The 1983 Kuwait bombings in collaboration with the Iraqi Dawa Party.
 The 1984 United States embassy annex bombing, killing 24 people.
 The hijacking of TWA flight 847 holding the 39 Americans on board hostage for weeks in 1985 and murder of one U.S. Navy sailor
 The Lebanon hostage crisis from 1982 to 1992.
 The bombing of the Israeli Embassy in Argentina killing twenty-nine people in 1992. Hezbollah operatives boasted of involvement.
 The bombing of a Jewish community center in Argentina killing 85 people in 1994. Ansar Allah, a cover name for Hezbollah's external operations wing, claimed responsibility. Argentine justice accused Iran of being behind the attacks because of Buenos Aires' decision to suspend a nuclear material delivery and technology transfer.
 The 1994 AC Flight 901 attack, killing 21 people, in Panama. Ansar Allah expressed support for the attack in a possible claim to responsibility.
 The 1996 Khobar Towers bombing, killing 19 US servicemen. On December 22, 2006, federal judge Royce C. Lamberth ruled that Iran was responsible for the attack, stating "The totality of the evidence at trial...firmly establishes that the Khobar Towers bombing was planned, funded, and sponsored by senior leadership in the government of the Islamic Republic of Iran. The defendants' conduct in facilitating, financing, and providing material support to bring about this attack was intentional, extreme, and outrageous."
 The 2012 Burgas bus bombing, killing 6, in Bulgaria. Hezbollah is believed to have carried out that attack on its own accord, without any Iranian involvement or foreknowledge.

Islamic Jihad is widely believed to be a nom de guerre of the Lebanese Islamist political movement and social service agency Hezbollah, which was founded in 1982 with many millions of dollars of aid and considerable training and logistical support from the Islamic Republic. Many believe the group promotes the Iranian agenda and that its goal is to overthrow the moderate governments in the area and create Islamic Republics based on that of Iran as well as the destruction of Israel. Iran has supplied the militant organization Hezbollah with substantial amounts of financial, training, weapons (including long range rockets), explosives, political, diplomatic, and organizational aid while persuading Hezbolla to take an action against Israel. Hezbollah's 1985 manifesto listed its four main goals as "Israel's final departure from Lebanon as a prelude to its final obliteration" According to reports released in February 2010, Hezbollah received $400 million from Iran.

Its methods include assassinations, kidnappings, suicide bombings, and guerrilla warfare. It is believed to be one of the Islamic resistance groups that made suicide bombings common use. Other attacks credited to Hezbollah include:
 Firing of hundreds of rockets into northern Israel on a daily basis and capture of Israeli soldiers in 2006.
 According to a senior U.S. intelligence officer, the 2005 assassination of Lebanese Prime Minister Rafic Hariri was carried out by Hezbollah at the direction of Iranian agents.

Shi'ite Militias in Iraq
Insurgents supported by Iran reportedly committed acts of terrorism. The United States State Department states that weapons are smuggled into Iraq and used to arm Iran's allies among the Shiite militias, including those of the anti-American cleric Muqtada al-Sadr and his Mahdi army.

During his address to the United States Congress on September 11, 2007, Commanding Officer for the United States forces in Iraq, General David Petraeus noted that the multinational forces in Iraq found that Iran's Quds force had provided training, equipment, funding, and direction to Shi'ite militia groups. “When we captured the leaders of these so-called special groups … and the deputy commander of a Lebanese Hezbollah department that was created to support their efforts in Iraq, we’ve learned a great deal about how Iran has, in fact, supported these elements and how those elements have carried out violent acts against our forces, Iraqi forces and innocent civilians.”

In 2015, Michael Weiss and Michael Pregent accused the Popular Mobilization Units, an organization of 40 mainly-Shi'ite militias backed by Iran, of committing extensive atrocities against Sunni civilians in the course of their war against the Islamic State of Iraq and the Levant, including "burning people alive in their houses, playing soccer with severed human heads, and ethnically cleansing and razing whole villages to the ground." Weiss and Pregent even suggested that "Iran's Shi'ite militias aren't a whole lot better than the Islamic State."

Kenya
Aggrey Adoli, police chief in Kenya's coastal region, said on 22 June 2012 that two Iranians, Ahmad Abolfathi Mohammad and Sayed Mansour Mousavi, believed to be members of Iran's Revolutionary Guards' Quds Force, were arrested and suspected of being involved in terrorism. One of the Iranians led counter-terrorism officers to recover 15 kilograms of a powdery substance believed to be explosive. The two Iranians allegedly admitted to plotting to attack United States, Israeli, Saudi, or British targets in Kenya. In court, Police Sgt. Erick Opagal, an investigator with Kenya's Anti-Terrorism Police Unit, said that the two Iranians had shipped over 100 kilograms of powerful explosives into Kenya.

It was later revealed that the targets included Gil Haskel, Israel's ambassador to Kenya. During a visit to Kenya in August, Israeli Deputy Foreign Minister Danny Ayalon praised Kenya for its efforts in stopping Iranian terror threats against Israeli and Jewish targets. Uganda, Ethiopia, and Kenya all expressed concern with Ayalon regarding Iran's attempts to increase terror activity in Africa.

Argentina

On 18 July 1994, there was an attack on the Argentine Israelite Mutual Association (AMIA) building in Buenos Aires, Argentina, which killed 85 people and injured hundreds. It was Argentina's deadliest bombing ever. Argentina accused Tehran in 2006 of being behind the attacks, and indicted several senior Iranian officials, including Hashemi Rafsanjani and Ahmad Vahidi, as well as Hezbollah's Imad Mughniyah.

Thailand
 
On 14 February 2012, a series of explosions occurred in Bangkok, Thailand. Thai authorities said that the bombings were a botched attempt by Iranian nationals to assassinate Israeli diplomats. Several Iranians were arrested and charged for the attacks, one of whom was badly injured.

France 

In October 2018 France froze Iranian financial assets in response to an alleged bomb plot to be carried out against an opposition group at a rally in Paris. The plot was said to be against the National Council of Resistance of Iran, which styles itself as Iran's government-in-exile. Assadollah Assadi, an Iranian diplomat in the Vienna embassy, was arrested in Germany in connection with the alleged plot to blow up a meeting of Iranian dissidents in Paris in June.

The rally was attended by an estimated 100,000 Iranians and hundreds of international dignitaries. A British Member of Parliament who attended said "Had the plot succeeded, it would have been the deadliest terror operation ever carried out in Europe. The US would undeniably have declared war on Iran – and it was only because the plot was foiled, world war three was averted." Belgian police had been informed of a possible attack on the rally, and found 550g (1lb 3oz) of explosive and a detonator in the car of Amir Saadouni and Nasimeh Naami. Saadouni, Naami, Assadi (believed to be the mastermind), and another Iranian went on trial in Antwerp on 27 November 2020. Court documents allege that Assadi was ordered by Iranian authorities to smuggle the explosives into Europe on a commercial flight, and give them to Saadouni and Naami, who were arrested two days later.

In February 2021 Belgian court in Antwerp sentenced Assadollah Assadi to 20-year jail term for this bomb plot. Amir Saadouni and Nasimeh Naami and a fourth man, Belgian-Iranian poet Merhad Arefani, who was arrested in Paris and accused of being an accomplice, were convicted of taking part in the plot and given jail terms of 15 to 18 years.

Denmark
In October 2018, Denmark said the Iranian government intelligence service had tried to carry out a plot to assassinate an Iranian Arab opposition figure on its soil. The planned assassination was of an exiled leader of the Arab Struggle Movement for the Liberation of Ahvaz (ASMLA). Sweden extradited a Norwegian national of Iranian background to Denmark in connection with the foiled plot against the ASMLA leader. In February 2020 Denmark arrested three leading members of an (ASMLA) group on suspicion of spying for Saudi Arabia and for supporting an attack in Iran in 2018.

United States

In August 2022, the U.S. Department of Justice charged an Iranian operative (Shahram Poursafi) with "plotting to assassinate former President Donald Trump's national security advisor John Bolton." Poursafi, a member of Iran’s Islamic Revolutionary Guard Corps, was charged for "providing and attempting to provide material support to a transnational murder plot". According to reports, Mike Pompeo was also a target, where a bounty of $1 million was placed for his murder.

Masih Alinejad, a journalist and human rights activist, has been a target of Iranian theocracy since fleeing Iran in 2009. In 2021, the FBI intercepted a kidnapping plot against her by Iranian agents who had planned to kidnap her from her New York home. U.S. prosecutors charged an Iranian intelligence officer for the kidnapping plot. In 2022, U.S. police arrested a man who had tried to break into Alinejad’s Brooklyn home while in possession of an AK47.

Venezuela 
In January 2020 Juan Guaidó, President of the National Assembly of Venezuela, accused Nicolás Maduro of allowing Qasem Soleimani and his Quds Forces to incorporate their sanctioned banks and their companies in Venezuela. Guaidó also said that Soleimani "led a criminal and terrorist structure in Iran that for years caused pain to his people and destabilized the Middle East, just as Abu Mahdi al-Muhandis did with Hezbollah."

Alleged Al-Qaeda ties
Al-Qaeda leaders regard Shia Muslims as heretics and have attacked their mosques and gatherings. In Iraq it considers Shi'i civilians to be legitimate targets for acts of violence. The group has been designated as a terrorist organization by Iran and many other countries, and Iran has a hostile relationship with the group. However, al-Qaeda and Iran allegedly formed an alliance during the 1990s in which Hezbollah trained al-Qaeda operatives. Iran detained hundreds of al-Qaeda operatives that entered the country following the 2001 invasion of Afghanistan; even though "the Iranian government has held most of them under house arrest, limited their freedom of movement, and closely monitored their activities," U.S. officials have expressed concerns that Iran has not fully accounted for their whereabouts, culminating in accusations of Iranian complicity in the 2003 Riyadh compound bombings.

1998 United States embassy bombings
On November 8, 2011, Judge John D. Bates ruled in federal court that Iran was liable for the 1998 United States embassy bombings in Kenya and Tanzania. In his 45-page decision, Judge Bates wrote that "Prior to their meetings with Iranian officials and agents Bin Laden and al Qaeda did not possess the technical expertise required to carry out the embassy bombings in Nairobi and Dar es Salaam."

USS Cole bombing
In March 2015, U.S. federal judge Rudolph Contreras found both Iran and Sudan complicit in the 2000 bombing of the USS Cole by al Qaeda, stating that "Iran was directly involved in establishing Al-Qaeda's Yemen network and supported training and logistics for Al-Qaeda in the Gulf region" through Hezbollah. Two previous federal judges had ruled that Sudan was liable for its role in the attack, but Contreras's "ruling is the first to find Iran partly responsible for the incident."

September 11

The U.S. indictment of bin Laden filed in 1998 stated that al-Qaeda "forged alliances ... with the government of Iran and its associated terrorist group Hezbollah for the purpose of working together against their perceived common enemies." On May 31, 2001, Steven Emerson and Daniel Pipes wrote in The Wall Street Journal that "Officials of the Iranian government helped arrange advanced weapons and explosives training for Al-Qaeda personnel in Lebanon where they learned, for example, how to destroy large buildings."

The 9/11 Commission Report stated that 8 to 10 of the hijackers on 9/11 previously passed through Iran and their travel was facilitated by Iranian border guards. The report also found "circumstantial evidence that senior Hezbollah operatives were closely tracking the travel of some of these future muscle hijackers into Iran in November 2000."

Two defectors from Iran's intelligence service testified that Iranian officials had "foreknowledge of the 9/11 attacks." By contrast, the 9/11 Commission "found no evidence that Iran or Hezbollah was aware of the planning for what later became the 9/11 attack. At the time of their travel through Iran, the al Qaeda operatives themselves were probably not aware of the specific details of their future operation." In addition, both bin al-Shibh and Khalid Sheikh Mohammed denied "any relationship between the hijackers and Hezbollah" and "any other reason for the hijackers' travel to Iran" besides "taking advantage of the Iranian practice of not stamping Saudi passports."

Riyadh compound bombings
According to Seth G. Jones and Peter Bergen, the 2003 Riyadh compound bombings were planned by al Qaeda operatives in Iran, with apparent Iranian complicity. In May 2003, then-State Department official Ryan Crocker provided information on the upcoming attack to Iranian officials, who apparently took no action.

Opposing view
A West Point study based on documents uncovered in Osama bin Laden's compound in Abbottabad found that the Iran-al Qaeda "relationship is not one of alliance, but of indirect and unpleasant negotiations over the release of detained jihadis and their families, including members of bin Laden's family." According to longtime Central Intelligence Agency (CIA) analyst Bruce Riedel: "Rather than being secretly in bed with each other as some have argued, al Qaeda had a fairly hostile relationship with the Iranian regime. To get members of his family out of Iran, for example, bin Laden had an Iranian diplomat kidnapped and then traded. The Iranians released some of his family members in the deal but then double-crossed al Qaeda by not letting one of his daughters, Fatima, free." Similarly, Steve Coll observes that bin Laden "was as paranoid about Iran as he was about the C.I.A. He worried that Iranian doctors might use medical treatment as a pretense to inject his sons with tracking chips."

Taliban insurgency
U.S. and British officials have accused Iran of giving weapons and support to the Taliban insurgency in Afghanistan. Due to the Taliban takeover of Afghanistan, however, Iran had to close some of its consulates as a result.

US court judgments
According to The Washington Free Beacon, On multiple occasions, US courts have awarded damages to the victims of terrorism; deemed payable by Iran on the basis that although the attacks were not directly controlled by Iran, evidence shows Iranian payments supporting these terrorist groups. There has been controversy over how to enforce these decisions in order to make Iran pay reparations.

Other allegations
Along with the above allegations, Iran is also accused of other acts of terrorism. Including:
 Mykonos restaurant assassinations. On September 17, 1992, Iranian-Kurdish insurgent leaders Sadegh Sharafkandi, Fattah Abdoli, Homayoun Ardalan and their translator Nouri Dehkordi were assassinated at the Mykonos Greek restaurant in Berlin, Germany. In the Mykonos trial, the courts found Kazem Darabi, an Iranian national who worked as a grocer in Berlin, and Lebanese Abbas Rhayel, guilty of murder and sentenced them to life in prison. Two other Lebanese, Youssef Amin and Mohamed Atris, were convicted of being accessories to murder. In its 10 April 1997 ruling, the court issued an international arrest warrant for Iranian intelligence minister Hojjat al-Islam Ali Fallahian after declaring that the assassination had been ordered by him with knowledge of supreme leader Grand Ayatollah Ali Khamenei and president Ayatollah Rafsanjani.
 The sponsorship of at least thirty terrorist attacks between 2011 and 2013 "in places as far flung as Thailand, New Delhi, Lagos, and Nairobi", including a 2011 plot to assassinate the Saudi Arabian ambassador to the US and bomb the Israeli and Saudi embassies in Washington, D.C.

See also

 Iran–Saudi Arabia proxy conflict
 Iranian expansionism
 Shia crescent
 Axis of Resistance
 Israel and state-sponsored terrorism
 Pakistan and state-sponsored terrorism
 Qatar and state-sponsored terrorism
 Terrorism and the Soviet Union
 United States and state-sponsored terrorism
 Iranian diplomat terror plot trial
 Kazem Rajavi
 Hybrid warfare against Iran
 Cyberwarfare and Iran

References

Foreign relations of Iran
Iran
Terrorism in Iran
Iran–Israel proxy conflict
Iran–United States relations
Iran–Saudi Arabia relations
Iran–Saudi Arabia proxy conflict
People killed in Ministry of Intelligence (Iran) operations